Rilous Carter is the Vice President of Disney's Epcot. He had been the VP of Disney's Hollywood Studios before switching positions with Dan Cockerell.

Early life
Carter was born in Town Creek, Alabama where he was also raised.

Education
Carter had an athletic scholarship and worked his way into academic scholarships to go to any college he wanted to go to in the US. He ended up going to the University of Alabama.

Career
Carter is the first African American to hold this position. In 2008, he was appointed as the Vice President of Disney's Hollywood Studios. Carter's non-traditional style of leading has separated himself from the rest. In his position as vice president of Disney's Epcot, he led the teams responsible for driving catering sales, services and banquet operations, and for theme park event operations at the 40-square-mile park and resort.

References

Sources
http://investing.businessweek.com/research/stocks/snapshot/snapshot.asp?capId=12343052

Living people
People from Town Creek, Alabama
Walt Disney Parks and Resorts people
Disney executives
Year of birth missing (living people)